Sebastián Díaz Aracena (born 26 February 1996) is a Chilean footballer that currently plays for Primera B de Chile club Deportes Temuco as a defensive midfielder.

Club career
He began his at hometown Unión Temuco, joining the youth set-up of the IX Region of La Araucanía team. He was promoted to first-team in 2013 when the club already was called Deportes Temuco, following the merger of both under Chilean legend Marcelo Salas administration.

International career
He has represented the Chile national team in under-17 and under-20 levels.

In 2015, he was called up by coach Nicolás Córdova for participe in the L'Alcúdia International Football Tournament at Valencia with Chile-U20 team, where he scored the only one goal during the semifinal match with UD Levante. Nevertheless, he was champion algonside the team of this tournament.

Honours
Chile U20
 L'Alcúdia International Tournament (1): 2015

References

External links
 
 T13.cl Profile

1996 births
Living people
People from Temuco
Chilean footballers
Chile youth international footballers
Chile under-20 international footballers
Chilean Primera División players
Primera B de Chile players
Unión Temuco footballers
Deportes Temuco footballers
Audax Italiano footballers
Association football midfielders